Inmarsat-4A F4, also known as Alphasat and Inmarsat-XL, is a large geostationary communications I-4 satellite operated by United Kingdom-based Inmarsat in partnership with the European Space Agency. Launched in 2013, it is used to provide mobile communications to Africa and parts of Europe and Asia.

Inmarsat-4A F4 has been constructed by EADS Astrium and Thales Alenia Space based on the Alphabus satellite bus. It was the first Alphabus spacecraft to be launched, and as such it carries several experimental communications systems in addition to its commercial payload.

Arianespace had been contracted to launch Inmarsat-4A F4, with an Ariane 5ECA rocket, flight number VA-214, delivering it and INSAT-3D into geosynchronous transfer orbit. The rocket lifted off from ELA-3 at Kourou at 19:54:07 UTC on 25 July 2013, with Inmarsat-4A F4 separating from the rocket around 27 minutes later.

The spacecraft operates in a geostationary orbit at a longitude of 25 degrees east.

European Data Relay System test 
The satellite was used as part of an in-orbit verification of the ESA European Data Relay System. In 2014, data from the Sentinel-1A satellite in LEO was transmitted via an optical link to the Alphasat in GEO and then relayed to a ground station using a Ka band downlink. The new system can offer speeds up to 7.2 Gbit/s in the future.

References

External links 

 EDRS SpaceDataHighway

Spacecraft launched in 2013
Satellites using the Alphabus bus
Inmarsat satellites